This is a list of Brazilian television related events from 2003.

Events
1 April - Dhomini Ferreira wins season 3 of Big Brother Brasil.

Debuts

Television shows

1970s
Turma da Mônica (1976–present)

1990s
Malhação (1995–present)
Cocoricó (1996–present)

2000s
Sítio do Picapau Amarelo (2001–2007)
Big Brother Brasil (2002–present)
FAMA (2002-2005)

Ending this year

Births

Deaths

See also
2003 in Brazil
List of Brazilian films of 2003